Malcolm MacLeod "Mac" Hickox (born September 2, 1946 in Boston) is a sprint canoeist who competed in the 1960s and early 70's. He was eliminated in the semifinals of the C-2 1000 m event at the 1968 Summer Olympics in Mexico City.

12 years Head Coach Mississauga Canoe Club - 
6x National Club Champions. 
Head Coach Canada's Canoe Sprint Olympic Team 1976 Montreal Olympics - personal coach John Wood Olympic Silver Medallist 1976 500m C1.

Teacher with Peel Board of Education 30 years-retired 2001.

Played Jr B hockey with Dixie Beehives 1964 and St Catherine's Black Hawks Junior A in 1965 and Hamilton Red Wings in 1967 - University Hockey with McMaster Marlins 1966 - 1970 and University of Toronto 1971 - CIAU Champions.

Currently Greater Toronto Hockey League (GTHL) on ice official Level 4.

Consultant with Canoe Kayak Canada 2004 to 2007 - rep for CKC on Coaching Association of Canada Task Force to write NCCP Competition Development Coaching Program.

 2003-2007 Founder and Head Coach Canadian Senior Dragonboat Club - CSDC.
 2006 World Club Crew Dragonboat Championships in Toronto - CSDC - 9 for 9 Gold Medals.
 2007-2014 National Development Director USA Canoe Kayak. 

 Ironman triathlete 2013 to 2021-qualified for IM 70.3 WORLDS  in 2018,2019 and 2021.

Awards
 1976 Canada Amateur Coach of Year
 1976 Mac Hickox Trophy presented to Canadian Canoe Association by Mississauga Canoe Club for annual presentation at National Championships - U18 C2 500m
 1984 Inducted into City of Mississauga Hall of Fame. Life Member of Mississauga Canoe Club.
 1996 Canoe Kayak Canada Gilbert Award recipient- Coaching Category

 Recognized as one of 25 Most Influential People in Mississauga Sport 1975 - 1999.
 2016 Mississauga Spirit of Sports Award Recipient.

 2018 Inducted into Mississauga Canoe Club HOF

References
Sports-reference.com profile

1946 births
American male canoeists
Canoeists at the 1968 Summer Olympics
Living people
Olympic canoeists of the United States